Annie Constance Tocker (6 May 1889 – 13 October 1980) was a notable New Zealand librarian, Methodist deaconess, nurse and child welfare officer. She was born in Greytown, Wairarapa, New Zealand in 1889.

References

1889 births
1980 deaths
New Zealand Methodist ministers
New Zealand nurses
People from Greytown, New Zealand
New Zealand librarians
Women librarians
New Zealand women nurses